Mohamed Chalali (born 4 April 1989) is an Algerian footballer. He plays for FC Versailles 78 in the Championnat National 3.

Personal 
Chalali was born in Montreuil-sous-Bois, Paris, to Algerian parents. His family is originally from the village of Ighil Ouantar, in the Seddouk District of Béjaïa.

Club career

France 
Chalali began his career with CA Romainville before he was scouted in summer 2003 from Le Havre AC. He made his Ligue 2 debut on 2 November 2007, coming on as a substitute against EA Guingamp. On 15 July 2009 he agreed a contract with LB Châteauroux.

Greece 
On 23 August 2010, Chalali signed a three-year contract with Greek club Panionios, joining them on a free transfer from Châteauroux. He made 12 league appearances for the club, 5 of which were as substitute.

Scotland 
The 2011 Greek riots motivated Chalali to seek a move abroad, and former Rangers defender and fellow Algerian Majid Bougherra recommended that he consider playing in Scotland. On 23 August 2011, Chalali signed for Scottish Premier League club Aberdeen. He had been recommended to Aberdeen manager Craig Brown by former Super League Greece colleague Youl Mawene, and had impressed during a trial earlier in the same month. Brown said Chalali had been the most impressive of all the trialists at the club in the 2011 summer transfer window, including Icelandic international Kari Arnason and former Dutch under-21 Maceo Rigters.

On the same day, despite having gone without sleep the previous evening to return to Greece to retrieve transfer-related paperwork, Chalali made his debut for Aberdeen as a second-half substitute in a 2011–12 Scottish League Cup win against Dundee. He was assigned squad number 18 for the 2011–12 Scottish Premier League season, and made his league debut, also as a substitute, in a 2–0 defeat away to Rangers on 28 August 2011. He made his first start for the club in an Aberdeenshire Cup semi-final fixture against Deveronvale the following day.

He scored his first goals for the club on 13 September 2011 in a testimonial match against Highland League side Keith, where he got a double and created another in a 6–0 victory. His first league start came in a 2–2 draw against Kilmarnock on 17 September 2011.
He scored his first league goal for Aberdeen at Tannadice against Dundee United, scoring the equaliser to make it 1–1, in a game which Aberdeen went on to win 2–1. In the same week he scored his second competitive goal for Aberdeen, in a 4–0 win in the Scottish Cup against Forfar. Near the end of the 2011–12 season, Chalali was advised that his contract with Aberdeen would not be extended.

Algeria 
On 10 August 2012, Chalali signed a two-year contract with Algerian Ligue Professionnelle 1 club ES Sétif.

International career 
Chalali has three caps with the Algerian Under 20 National Team. On 12 October 2010, Chalali made his debut for the Algerian Under-23 National Team in a 1–0 friendly win over Qatar.

He went on to become captain of the U-23 side. In August 2011, he informed Aberdeen that he was likely to feature in the 2011 CAF U-23 Championship, a tournament that also serves as the qualification process for the 2012 Olympics, and that he had ambitions to represent the full national side in the qualifiers for the 2012 African Cup of Nations. On 16 November 2011, he was selected as part of Algeria's squad for the 2011 CAF U-23 Championship in Morocco.

References

External links 
 Mohamed Chalali profile at Aberdeen F. C.
 LFP Profile
 
 

Algerian footballers
Algeria under-23 international footballers
Le Havre AC players
1989 births
French people of Kabyle descent
Ligue 2 players
Living people
Panionios F.C. players
Aberdeen F.C. players
Super League Greece players
Scottish Premier League players
Expatriate footballers in Greece
Expatriate footballers in Scotland
ES Sétif players
Ligue 1 players
Kabyle people
Algeria youth international footballers
2011 CAF U-23 Championship players
Association football forwards
LB Châteauroux players
AC Boulogne-Billancourt players
FC Versailles 78 players
Algeria international footballers
Algerian expatriates in Greece
Algerian Ligue Professionnelle 1 players
JS Kabylie players
JSM Béjaïa players
US Lusitanos Saint-Maur players